Rufus is a masculine given name and a surname.

Rufus may also refer to:

Places
 Rufus, Oregon, a city in Sherman County
 Rufus Castle, 15th-century castle in Portland, England
 Rufus River, a river of New South Wales, Australia

Animal species scientific names
 Canis rufus, the red wolf
 Cursorius rufus, the Burchell's courser, a bird species
 Lynx rufus, the bobcat
 Selasphorus rufus, the rufous hummingbird

Arts and entertainment

Artists
 Rufus (band), a 1970s/1980s funk band fronted by Chaka Khan
 Rüfüs Du Sol, a contemporary indie dance group from Sydney, Australia (formerly known as RÜFÜS)

Albums
 Rufus (Rufus album), 1973
 Rufus (jazz album), a 1963 album featuring Archie Shepp, John Tchicai, Don Moore and J. C. Moses

Films
 Rufus (film), a 2012 Canadian film directed by Dave Schultz
 Rufus, a 2016 American television film; see List of Nickelodeon original films

Other
 Rufus (software), a free, open-source Microsoft Windows application for creating bootable USB drives
 33158 Rúfus, a main-belt minor planet; see List of minor planets: 33001-34000
 Rufus, the original name of the Demon core, a subcritical mass of plutonium used in the Manhattan Project

See also 
 Rufous, a shade of red
 Rufous-fronted (disambiguation)
 Rufina (disambiguation)